Abdelmadjed Touil (born 11 February 1989 in El Oued) is an Algerian distance runner who specialises in the 1500 metres and 3000 metres steeplechase. He won the silver medal at the 2011 Summer Universiade. In addition, he represented his country at the 2013 World Championships, narrowly missing the final.

He has a twin brother, Imad, who is also a runner.

Competition record

Personal bests
Outdoor
1500 metres – 3:39.87 (Villeneuve-d'Ascq 2009)
3000 metres steeplechase – 8:15.93 (Rabat 2013)

References

1989 births
Living people
Algerian male steeplechase runners
Algerian male middle-distance runners
People from El Oued
World Athletics Championships athletes for Algeria
Universiade medalists in athletics (track and field)
Universiade silver medalists for Algeria
Medalists at the 2011 Summer Universiade
Athletes (track and field) at the 2013 Mediterranean Games
Mediterranean Games competitors for Algeria
21st-century Algerian people
20th-century Algerian people